Sarcohyla cembra, also known as the Southern Sierra Madre treefrog, is a species of frog in the family Hylidae. It is endemic to Mexico. Until recently, it was only known from two male specimens: one from its type locality on the Pacific slopes of the Sierra Madre del Sur mountains, Pochutla District, Oaxaca, and another one from Sierra de Yucuyacua south-east of Llano de Guadalupe, in north-west Oaxaca. After having not been seen after 1993, it was feared that the species might be extinct. However, the species was rediscovered in field surveys in 2011–2012, extending its range with a new locality about 10 km north of the type locality.

Etymology
The specific name cembra is Latin for "timber" and refers to the pine-oak forest this species inhabits.

Taxonomy
It was initially thought that the female specimen that became the holotype of Sarcohyla miahuatlanensis could be a female Sarcohyla cembra, but it was eventually identified as a new, distinct species. Nevertheless, the two species are morphologically similar.

Description
The holotype is a male that measures  in snout–vent length, depending on the source. The second specimen, also a male, measures  SVL. The body is moderately robust. The tympanum is small and indistinct. Skin is smooth on the dorsum and limbs, weakly granular on venter, chin, and ventral surfaces of thighs. The fingers are without webbing whereas the toes are moderately webbed. The dorsum was bright greenish yellow upon capture, changing to dull green. There is brown and green reticulations along sides. The throat and chest are white. The ventral  sides of limbs and belly are pinkish tan. The iris is brownish yellow.

Male advertisement call  is a short "wrack", often followed by a series of low "chuckles".

Habitat and conservation
The natural habitats of this species are pine-oak forest. The second specimen was found inside an arboreal bromeliad on a fallen oak tree at  asl.

This species was only known from two specimens collected in 1969 and 1993, until it was again found in 2011–2012. Its habitat, the pine-oak forests, are under threat caused by logging and agriculture. Also chytridiomycosis might have impacted the species.

References

Endemic amphibians of Mexico
Fauna of the Sierra Madre del Sur
Amphibians described in 1974
Taxonomy articles created by Polbot
Taxa named by Janalee P. Caldwell
cembra